The President of the Supreme Court of the United Kingdom is equivalent to the now-defunct position of Senior Lord of Appeal in Ordinary, also known as the Senior Law Lord, who was the highest ranking among the Lords of Appeal in Ordinary (the judges who exercised the judicial functions of the House of Lords). The President is not the most senior judge of the judiciary in England and Wales; that position belongs to the Lord Chief Justice. The current President is Robert Reed, since 13 January 2020.

History
From 1900 to 1969, when the Lord Chancellor was not present, a former Lord Chancellor would preside at judicial sittings of the House of Lords. If no former Lord Chancellor was present, the most senior Lord of Appeal in Ordinary present would preside, seniority being determined by rank in the peerage. In the years following World War II, it became less common for Lord Chancellors to have time to gain judicial experience in office, making it anomalous for former holders of the office to take precedence. As a result, on 22 May 1969, the rules were changed such that if the Lord Chancellor was not present (as was normally the case), the most senior Law Lord, by appointment as a Lord of Appeal in Ordinary rather than peerage, would preside.

In 1984, the system was amended to provide that judges be appointed as Senior and Second Senior Lords of Appeal in Ordinary, rather than taking the roles by seniority. The purpose of the change was to allow an ailing Lord Diplock to step aside from presiding, yet remain a Law Lord.

On 1 October 2009, the judicial functions of the House of Lords were transferred to the new Supreme Court under the provisions of the Constitutional Reform Act 2005. The Senior Law Lord, Nick Phillips, and the Second Senior Law Lord became, respectively, the President and the Deputy President of the new court. The same day, the Queen by warrant established a place for the President of the Supreme Court in the order of precedence, immediately after the Lord Speaker (the Speaker of the House of Lords).

List of Senior Lords of Appeal in Ordinary
 The Lord Reid (1969–1975)
 The Lord Wilberforce (1975–1982)
 The Lord Diplock (1982–1984)
 The Lord Fraser of Tullybelton (1984–1985)
 The Lord Scarman (1985–1986)
 The Lord Keith of Kinkel (1986–1996)
 The Lord Goff of Chieveley (1996–1998)
 The Lord Browne-Wilkinson (1998–2000)
 The Lord Bingham of Cornhill (2000–2008)
 The Lord Phillips of Worth Matravers (200830 September 2009)

List of presidents of the Supreme Court

See also
 Deputy President of the Supreme Court of the United Kingdom
 Justice of the Supreme Court of the United Kingdom
 Senior President of Tribunals
 Lord Chief Justice of England and Wales
 Lord President of the Court of Session

Notes

References

Law lords
Lists of judges in the United Kingdom
Judiciaries of the United Kingdom